Brooks Creek is a  long 3rd order tributary to the Haw River in Chatham County, North Carolina.

Course
Brooks Creek rises about 1.5 miles north of Gum Springs, North Carolina in Chatham County and then flows east to the Haw River across from Bynum.

Watershed
Brooks Creek drains  of area, receives about 47.4 in/year of precipitation, and has a wetness index of 424.50 and is about 74% forested.

See also
List of rivers of North Carolina

References

Additional maps

External links
Picture of Brooks Creek below Eddie Perry Road
Picture of Brooks Creek from Discover Life

Rivers of North Carolina
Rivers of Chatham County, North Carolina
Tributaries of the Cape Fear River